The Value of Nothing: How to Reshape Market Society and Redefine Democracy is a book by Raj Patel about the economic crisis and its effect on consumers. It was published in 2010.

The Value of Nothing was on The New York Times best-seller list during February 2010 and has received many positive reviews from academics, activists, and journalists.

Translated editions
in Greek: Η αξία των πραγμάτων, Αγορές και δημοκρατικόί θεσμοί (2012)

See also
Stuffed and Starved: The Hidden Battle for the World Food System, by Raj Patel (2008)
No Land! No House! No Vote! Voices from Symphony Way, by the Symphony Way Pavement Dwellers (2011)

References

Books about economic crises
2010 non-fiction books